Zverev (from зверь meaning beast) is a Russian masculine surname also used in Belarus; its feminine counterpart is Zvereva, Zverava. It may refer to

Alexander Zverev Sr. (born 1960), Soviet tennis player
Alexander Zverev (born 1997), German tennis player of Russian descent
Alexander Zverev (sprinter) (born 1989), Russian sprinter
Anatoly Zverev (1931–1986), Soviet artist
Arseny Zverev (1900–1969), Soviet finance minister
Ellina Zvereva (born 1960), Belarusian discus thrower 
Mischa Zverev (born 1987), Russian-born German tennis player
Natasha Zvereva (born 1971), Belarusian tennis player 
Nicolas Zverev (1887–1965), Russian-French ballet dancer
Nikolai Zverev (1832–1893), pianist and teacher of major Russian classical music figures
Yana Zvereva (born 1989), Russian épée fencer

See also
Zverev Bridge, a bridge in Moscow

Russian-language surnames